Schistura coruscans is a species of ray-finned fish in the stone loach genus Schistura from the Nam San drainage, a tributary of the Nam Ngum in Laos.

References 

C
Fish described in 2000